Have a Nice Trip may refer to:
Have a Nice Trip (The Suite Life of Zack & Cody)
Have a Nice Trip (album), a 2003 album by Die Apokalyptischen Reiter